The particolored flying squirrel (Hylopetes alboniger) is a species of rodent in the family Sciuridae. It is found in Bangladesh, Bhutan, Cambodia, China, India, Laos, Myanmar, Nepal, Thailand, and Vietnam. Its natural habitat is subtropical or tropical dry forests. It is threatened by habitat loss.

The Himalayan large-eared flying squirrel (Priapomys leonardi) was formerly considered a subspecies of H. alboniger, but phylogenetic analysis revealed that it occupies a completely different place in the taxonomy of flying squirrels, and it as thus classified as a distinct species in its own genus.

References

Hylopetes
Rodents of India
Mammals of Bangladesh
Mammals of Nepal
Mammals described in 1836
Taxonomy articles created by Polbot